Cumming-Parker House is a historic estate located at Esopus in Ulster County, New York.  It is a two-story, wood-frame house. It was built about 1836 and enlarged about 1875. It features a gallery along all four sides. Also on the property are a boat house, two-seat privy, summer house, and the remains of a large ice house.

It was listed on the National Register of Historic Places in 2010.

References

Houses on the National Register of Historic Places in New York (state)
Houses completed in 1836
Houses in Ulster County, New York
National Register of Historic Places in Ulster County, New York